Pierre Francois Hanekom (born  in Port Elizabeth, South Africa) is a South African rugby union player, currently playing with the . His regular position is prop.

Career

Youth

Hanekom played secondary school rugby for the Cradock-based Marlow Agricultural College and led to his inclusion in the Eastern Province Under-18 Craven Week squads in 2006 and 2007, where he was the second-heaviest participant.

Sharks

He was a member of the  squad in 2008 and the  squads during 2009 and 2010. In 2011, he was named in their Vodacom Cup squad, but was never involved in first team action.

Boland Cavaliers

Shortly after making his senior debut in Wellington, Hanekom moved there on a permanent basis by joining the  prior to the 2012 Currie Cup First Division season. He remained involved in first team duties throughout the 2013 and 2014 seasons.

References

South African rugby union players
Living people
1989 births
Rugby union players from Port Elizabeth
Rugby union props
Boland Cavaliers players
Sharks (Currie Cup) players